Carlos Arturo Cáceres Pino (born 28 April 1977) is a Chilean former professional footballer who played as a striker.

Career
Cáceres was a prolific striker in the Chilean football, playing for 15 professional teams. Outside of Chile, he played for clubs in Mexico, Malaysia and Hong Kong. Due to his physical power, he was nicknamed Búfalo (Buffalo).

In 2001, he became the Primera B Top Goalscorer playing for Deportes Antofagasta by scoring 23 goals.

In 2011, he played for Quesos Kümey, an amateur club from a cheese (Queso in Spanish) manufacturing company based in Purranque, Chile, that competed in the 2011 Copa Chile. At the same time, he performed as coach for the Universidad Católica Academy in Osorno, Chile, alongside the former Paraguayan footballer Rolando Azás.

Honours
 Primera B de Chile Top Goalscorer: 2001

References

External links
 
 
 Carlos Cáceres at PlaymakerStats

1977 births
Living people
Chilean footballers
Footballers from Santiago
Chilean expatriate footballers
Association football forwards
Provincial Osorno footballers
Deportes Temuco footballers
C.D. Antofagasta footballers
Santiago Morning footballers
Cobresal footballers
Chiapas F.C. footballers
Unión La Calera footballers
Unión Española footballers
Puerto Montt footballers
Deportes La Serena footballers
Rangers de Talca footballers
Ñublense footballers
Curicó Unido footballers
Perak F.C. players
Kitchee SC players
Quesos Kümey footballers
Chilean Primera División players
Primera B de Chile players
Liga MX players
Malaysia Super League players
Hong Kong First Division League players
Chilean expatriate sportspeople in Mexico
Chilean expatriate sportspeople in Malaysia
Chilean expatriate sportspeople in Hong Kong
Expatriate footballers in Mexico
Expatriate footballers in Malaysia
Expatriate footballers in Hong Kong
Hong Kong League XI representative players
Chilean football managers